Hemat Abedinejad (born June 23, 1980) is an Iranian footballer. He currently plays for Pas Hamedan F.C. in the IPL.

Club career
In 2009, Abedinejad joined Pas Hamedan F.C.

 Assists

References

1980 births
Living people
Pas players
Iranian footballers
Bargh Shiraz players
Association football defenders